Posers is a 2002 Canadian drama film written and directed by Katie Tallo.

Plot
Adria (Jessica Pare) is a young woman living the young urban career professional life seemingly all around innocent and radiantly angelic with a dark side, she's getting more criminally inclined with a trio of morally depraved young women who live for two things, vanity and revenge, who does a voiceover of the rules of getting their good favor and worshipping the queen bee, Love (Stefanie von Pfetten). They go to a nightclub and then follow Sadie (Danielle Kind), a young woman to the washroom and then swarmbeat her to death for cheating on Love with her boyfriend. Police Detective Sinclair (Adam Beach) investigates the four for the murder and gets nowhere cause a rule by Adria, "When something happens, blame it on a man" and begins a relationship with Adria, learning that her mother is in the hospital. Suddenly, Love has disappeared with blood smeared everywhere in her apartment which traumatises the other three. Then as the three go about their lives, their conscience gets the better of the them, getting more pathologically paranoid. At a party, the girls then argue and Vonny produces a handgun, then leaves the room only to be fatally shot by police. Ruth (Emily Hampshire) is then arrested for the murder of Love and Sinclair reveals a twist ending, Adria does not have a hospital-ridden mother, who passed away long ago and Adria suffers from multiple personality disorder, meaning Adria actually murdered Love.

Cast
Jessica Paré as Adria
Sarain Boylan as Vonny
Stefanie von Pfetten as Love
Emily Hampshire as Ruth
Adam Beach as Police Detective Sinclair
Chad Connell as Pretty Boy
Dani Kind as Sadie (as Danielle Kind)
Adrian Langley as Cal
Alexandra Sinclair as Kaitlin

Release 
Posers premiered on September 22, 2002 at Cinéfest, followed by a home video release in early 2004.

Production 
Filming for Posers took place in Ottawa during November 2001, over a period of 15 days. The film marked Tallo's second feature film, following the made for TV movie Juiced.

Reception 
DVD Talk reviewed Posers, writing that The characters and settings of Posers are good enough to stand on their own merits. Unfortunately, on top of what would have been an interesting, admittedly quieter film, Tallo has shoe-horned a murder mystery and compensated by trying to "surprise" the viewer at every turn."

References

External links
 

Canadian drama films
English-language Canadian films
Films shot in Ottawa
Canadian independent films
2002 drama films
2002 films
2000s English-language films
2000s Canadian films